Danie Keulder (born 2 August 1973) is a former Namibian cricketer. He played for Namibia between 1994, when he first appeared for the team in the ICC Trophy, against Canada which his team lost by eight wickets, having put a mere 51 runs on the board, and 2005.

He also participated in a not-so crushing defeat by the Netherlands, which saw Klaas-Jan van Noortwijk and Feiko Kloppenburg score 255 of the 314 runs between six batsmen in 50 overs, including a 228 second-wicket partnership.

Keulder retired from cricket in 2005 following a back injury.

References

External links

1973 births
Living people
Namibian cricket captains
Namibia One Day International cricketers
Namibian cricketers